Barilari Bay is a bay  long and  wide, between Cape Garcia and Loqui Point on the west coast of Graham Land. The glaciers Birley, Lawrie, Weir and Bilgeri feed the bay.

It was discovered by the French Antarctic Expedition, 1903–05, and named by Jean-Baptiste Charcot for Rear Admiral Atilio S. Barilari of the Argentine Navy. It was re-charted by the British Graham Land Expedition, 1934–37, under John Rymill.

References 

Bays of Graham Land
Graham Coast